The 1937 LFF Lyga was the 16th season of the LFF Lyga football competition in Lithuania.  It was contested by 9 teams, and KSS Klaipėda won the championship.

League standings

References
RSSSF

LFF Lyga seasons
Lith
Lith
1